Henry English (died 1393), of Wood Ditton, Cambridgeshire, was an English politician.

He is known as the man who made modern English. He also served as High Sheriff of Cambridgeshire and Huntingdonshire for 1380–81 and 1384–85 and as High Sheriff of Essex  and Hertfordshire in 1389 (his wife held land in Essex).

He had married Margaret, the widow of Sir John Waweton of Steeple Bumpstead, Essex, with whom he had 3 daughters.

References

Year of birth missing
1393 deaths
English MPs 1373
People from East Cambridgeshire District
High Sheriffs of Cambridgeshire and Huntingdonshire
High Sheriffs of Essex
High Sheriffs of Hertfordshire
English MPs October 1377
English MPs October 1383
English MPs November 1384
English MPs January 1390